Hugh G. S. Gray (10 August 1875) was a Scottish player on the 1899 British Isles tour to Australia (often referred to as the England team).

In 1899, Gray was invited to represent the British Isles on the team's first official tour to Australia. After the tourists lost the First Test, captain Matthew Mullineux made several team changes, and Alf Bucher was replaced by Gray, a trialist who normally played as a forward. Despite a comprehensive win in the Second Test, Gray was dropped for the Third Test and Boucher was back on the wing.

He normally played as a forward, but went on the wing for one of his games against Australia.

Gray played for Coventry RFC in England.

Citations

Bibliography 
 Bath, Richard (ed.) (2007). The Scotland Rugby Miscellany. Vision Sports Publishing. .

1875 births
British & Irish Lions rugby union players from Scotland
Coventry R.F.C. players
Scottish rugby union players
Year of death missing
Rugby union forwards